Edward Ball may refer to:

Ed Ball (musician) (born 1959), London musician and executive of Creation Records
Edward Ball (American author) (born 1959), American writer of non-fiction
Edward Ball (Australian politician) (1827–1894), Australian politician
Edward Ball (businessman) (1888–1981), manager of the duPont trust and reformer of the Florida East Coast Railway
Edward Ball (congressman) (1811–1872), U.S. Representative from Ohio
Edward Ball (British politician) (1793–1865), English MP for Cambridgeshire
Edward Ball (cricketer) (1859–1917), English cricketer
Edward Fitzball (1792–1873), English playwright, real name Edward Ball

See also
Ed Balls (born 1967), British politician